Giovanelli is an Italian surname, derived from the given name Giovanni. Notable people with this surname include:

 Federico Giovanelli (1932–2018), New York mobster
 Francesco Giovanelli, Italian sailor
 Gordy Giovanelli (born 1925), American rower
 Guido Giovanelli, Italian sailor
 Ivo Giovanelli (1919–2009), Croatian water polo player
 Louise Giovanelli (born 1993), British artist
 Massimo Giovanelli (born 1967), Italian rugby union player
 Miriam Giovanelli (born 1989), Italian-Spanish actress and model
 Renato Giovanelli (born 1923), Italian architect
 Riccardo Giovanelli (born 1946), Italian born astronomer
 Ron Giovanelli (1915–1984), Australian physicist and solar researcher
 Ronaldo Giovanelli (born 1967), Brazilian football player
 Ruggiero Giovannelli, Italian composer

See also
 Palazzo Giovanelli, Venice

Italian-language surnames
Patronymic surnames
Surnames from given names